LT may refer to:

Companies and organisations
 LTU International, a German airline (IATA code LT)
 LJ Air, a Chinese airline (IATA code LT)
 Larsen & Toubro, an Indian engineering conglomerate, officially known as L&T
 Life Teen, a Roman Catholic organization for youth ministry
 London Transport (brand), the name for various transport authorities 
 Lord & Taylor, a North American luxury department store chain
 Lorien Trust, a company that runs live roleplaying games 
 Lucent Technologies (old company), which merged with Alcatel to form Alcatel-Lucent

Places
 Lithuania (ISO 3166 code)
 Lithuanian language (ISO 639-1 code)
 Province of Latina, Italy (vehicle plate code)
 Long Trail, a footpath in the American state of Vermont

Science, technology, and mathematics

Biology and medicine
 Lactate threshold, a measurement used by athletes to determine the amount of strenuous work capable by their muscles
 Lymphotoxin, a cytokine
 Gallid alphaherpesvirus 1, the cause of infectious laryngotracheitis in poultry
 SV40 large T antigen, a proto-oncogene derived from polyomavirus SV40
Heat-labile enterotoxin, a toxin produced by enterotoxigenic Escherichia coli

Electronics and computing
 .lt, Internet country code top-level domain for Lithuania
 LaGrande Technology, former name for the Trusted Execution Technology (Intel's implementation of Trusted Computing)
 Left total, in sound recording, the left channel of the stereo Left total/Right total downmix
 Lightning Talk, a very short presentation lasting only a few minutes, given at a conference or similar forum.
 Linear Technology, manufacturer of integrated circuits
 Link Training, process by which the transmitter and receiver on a high-speed serial link communicate with each other in order to tune their equalization settings
 Logic Theorist, a computer program written in 1955–56 to prove mathematical theorems; called "the first artificial intelligence program"
 LanguageTool, an extension for many web browsers

Mathematics
 Laplace transform
 Less than
 Logic Theorist, a computer program written in 1955–56 to prove mathematical theorems; called "the first artificial intelligence program"
 Lorentz transformation

Vehicles
 LT, a type of London bus
 LT (car), an early Swedish automobile
 LT, a trim level for Chevrolet vehicles
 GM LT1 engine several engines by General Motors
 Lincoln Mark LT
 Volkswagen LT, a light truck
 McLaren 675LT, a British supercar
 Logistics Trainer, code name for the Lockheed F-117 Nighthawk stealth attack aircraft

Other uses in science, technology, and mathematics
 Long ton, a unit of measurement

Other uses 
Lieutenant, sometimes abbreviated as Lt, Lt. Lieut, and similar
Louis Tomlinson (born 24 december 1991), a British singer, songwriter
 Ladytron, a British electronic band
 Lawrence Taylor, retired American Football outside linebacker
 LaDainian Tomlinson, retired American Football running back
 Lead time, the latency between initiation and execution, as in supply chain management
 Left tackle, a position in American and Canadian football
 Lieutenant, in military use
 Lisbon Treaty, a 2007 agreement amending the constitutional basis of the European Union
 Lithuanian language (ISO 639-1 code)
 Lithuanian litas (Lt), former currency of Lithuania, replaced by the Euro in 2015
 Living Things (Linkin Park album), 2012
 Local Time, in the context of time zones
 Looney Tunes, theatrical cartoon series

See also
 BLT, a sandwich consisting of bacon, lettuce, tomato and bread
 LTU (disambiguation)